Seema is a 1971 Hindi film directed by Surendra Mohan. Though this film was not a big commercial success, it is renowned for its lilting musical score by the duo of Shankar Jaikishan and is especially remembered for a very famous song by Tamil singer Sharda Rajan Iyengar with Mohammad Rafi; "Jab Bhi Yeh Dil Udaas Hota Hai", which was penned by Gulzar.

Cast
Rakesh Roshan  
Kabir Bedi   
Simi Garewal as Seema
Bharathi Vishnuvardhan   
Padma Khanna  
Chand Usmani   
Abhi Bhattacharya  
  Gopal Sehgal
  Kanchan Mattu
Sulochana

Music
The music of this movie was composed by Shankar Jaikishan 
"Jab Bhi Ye Dil Udaas Hotaa Hai, Jaane Kaun Aas Paas Hotaa Hai" - Mohammed Rafi, Sharda
"Ladki Chale Jab Sadko Par Aaye Qayamat" - Kishore Kumar
"Ek Thi Nindiya Do The Naina" - Suman Kalyanpur
"Vaqt Thodaa Saa Abhi Kuchh Aur Guzar Jaane De" - Kishore Kumar, Asha Bhosle
"Dil Mera Kho Gaya, Kho Jane Do" - Kishore Kumar, Asha Bhosle
"Ek Thi Nindiya Do The Naina (Sushma)" - Sushma Shrestha
"Kispe Hai Tera Dil, Naam Lena Mushkil" - Mohammed Rafi, Asha Bhosle

References

External links

1971 films
1970s Hindi-language films
Films scored by Shankar–Jaikishan
Films directed by Surendra Mohan